Viscera (sing. viscus) are an organism's internal organs.

Viscera may also refer to:
 Viscera (wrestler), American professional wrestler
 Viscera (Byla + Jarboe album) (2007)
 Viscera (God Module album) (2005)
 Viscera (Jenny Hval album) (2011)
 Viscera (EP), a 2016 EP by My Epic

Visceral may also refer to:
 Visceral (album), by Getter (2018)
 Visceral: The Poetry of Blood, book by RJ Arkhipov (2018)

See also
 Viscera Film Festival, a horror film festival
 Visceral Games, American video game studio